Timo Pärssinen (born January 19, 1977 in Lohja, Finland) is a retired Finnish professional ice hockey forward.

Playing career
Timo Pärssinen began his pro career with TuTo Turku in 1994 and then moved to Kokkolan Hermes in 1997.  He would move to HPK the next season and spent the next three seasons with the team. He was drafted by the Mighty Ducks of Anaheim as their fourth-round pick, #102 overall, in the 2001 NHL Entry Draft.  He spent one season is North America, splitting his time with Anaheim and their AHL affiliate the Cincinnati Mighty Ducks, playing 13 regular season games in the National Hockey League, scoring three assists and collecting 2 penalty minutes.  He returned to Finland the next season with HIFK where he spent three seasons.  In 2005, he moved to EV Zug in Switzerland's Nationalliga A before moving to Sweden to play for Timrå.

Awards

 Jarmo Wasama memorial trophy as best rookie in 1999
 Veli-Pekka Ketola trophy for most points scored during regular season play in 2004
 Aarne Honkavaara trophy for most goals scored during regular season play in 2004
 Lasse Oksanen trophy for best player during regular season play in 2004
 Kultainen kypärä award for best player as selected by the players in 2004

Career statistics

Regular season and playoffs

International

External links
 

1977 births
Living people
Anaheim Ducks draft picks
Cincinnati Mighty Ducks players
EV Zug players
Finnish ice hockey forwards
HIFK (ice hockey) players
HPK players
Kokkolan Hermes players
Lahti Pelicans players
Mighty Ducks of Anaheim players
People from Lohja
Timrå IK players
TuTo players
Sportspeople from Uusimaa